The Indonesia 2022 FIFA World Cup bid was the first official bid from the Football Association of Indonesia (PSSI) to host the FIFA World Cup. FIFA rejected the bid for lack of government support on 19 March 2010. Indonesia was one of four Asian countries bidding to bring the tournament to Asia for a second time, the 2002 tournament having been played in Japan and South Korea. Indonesia, under the name of the Dutch East Indies, had been the first Asian nation to compete in the World Cup, when they participated in the 1938 event, and they lost to Hungary in the first round.

Bid committee 
The chairman of the bid committee was Ginandjar Kartasasmita, the chairman of the Indonesian senate, and the vice chairman was Gita Wirjawan from Pertamina, a national oil and gas company. The committee also included: Syarief Bastaman, Joko Driyono, Hamka Kady, Fauzi Bowo, Hayono Isman, Nirwan Dermawan Bakrie, and Josef Refo.

The bid was launched at a time when there was pressure from Indonesian football fans to Nurdin Halid to step down from his position as the chairman of PSSI. The bid itself was used by Jusuf Kalla in his campaign to gain support for his presidential candidacy in 2009, though his effort was unsuccessful.

Bid rejection 
Indonesia was alone among the bidding nations in not having official government backing, although some support was offered in a 2009 interview by previous Youth and Sports Minister, Adhyaksa Dault. On 19 March 2010, FIFA announced that Indonesia's bid had been rejected, because required documents and guarantees had not been provided, as the government felt that the bid would not gain popular support in the country.

Proposed venues

Aftermath 
Nine years after the Indonesia 2022 bid was rejected, Indonesia was selected to host the 2021 FIFA U-20 World Cup after strong government and public support and awarded on 24 October 2019 in Shanghai, China.

A year later, The COVID-19 pandemic forced FIFA to cancel the 2021 tournament and award the 2023 FIFA U-20 World Cup hosting rights to Indonesia on 24 December 2020.

References 

Indonesia
2022